Neocallicrania is a genus of armoured ground-crickets in the family Tettigoniidae. There are about six described species in Neocallicrania, found mainly in southwest Europe.

Species
These six species belong to the genus Neocallicrania:
 Neocallicrania barrosi Barat, 2013 (barros' saddle bush-cricket)
 Neocallicrania bolivarii (Seoane, 1878) (Bolivar's Saddle Bush-cricket)
 Neocallicrania lusitanica (Aires & Menano, 1916) (Coruche Saddle Bush-cricket)
 Neocallicrania miegii (Bolívar, 1873) (Mieg's Saddle Bush-cricket)
 Neocallicrania selligera (Charpentier, 1825) (lusitanian saddle bush-cricket)
 Neocallicrania serrata (Bolívar, 1885)

References

External links

 

Bradyporinae